Dwight B. Heath (born November 19, 1930) is Research Professor of Anthropology at Brown University in Providence, Rhode Island. He has published extensively in many areas of anthropology, especially on the subject of alcohol drinking patterns and their relationship to culture. Heath earned his Ph.D. from Yale in 1959, as well as his undergraduate degree from Harvard. Heath has critiqued the viability of neo-prohibitionism as an effective approach to reducing alcohol abuse and consults on a diversity of issues with governments and scientific organizations around the world.

Bibliography

Heath, Dwight B. Drinking Occasions: Comparative Perspectives on Alcohol and Culture. Philadelphia, PA: Taylor and Francis, 2000.
Heath, Dwight B. (Ed.) International Handbook on Alcohol and Culture. Westport, CT: Greenwood, 1995.
Heath, Dwight B. American Attitudes toward Alcohol Lead to Underage Drinking. In: Egendorf, Laura K. (Ed.) Teen Alcoholism. San Diego, CA: Greenhaven, 2001.
Heath, Dwight B. Culture and Substance Abuse. In: Mezzech, Juan E. and Fabrega, Horacio (Eds.) Cultural Psychiatry: International Perspectives. Philadelphia, PA: W.B. Saunders, 2001.
Heath, Dwight B. (Ed.) "A Journal of the Pilgrims at Plymouth; Mourt's Relation" 1963

References

1930 births
Living people
American anthropologists
American anthropology writers
American male non-fiction writers
Brown University faculty
Anthropology educators
Harvard University alumni
Yale University alumni